Alphonsus Bernard Collins (18 June 1935 – 26 March 2018) was a member of the House of Commons of Canada at the Souris—Moose Mountain electoral district from 1993 to 1997. Born in Regina, Saskatchewan, his career has been in education and administration.

He was elected to Parliament as a Liberal party candidate in the 1993 federal election then served in the 35th Canadian Parliament. Collins left Canadian politics after losing the riding to Reform party candidate Roy Bailey in the 1997 election. He died in 2018 at the age of 82.

Electoral record

References

External links
 

1935 births
Living people
Liberal Party of Canada MPs
Members of the House of Commons of Canada from Saskatchewan
Politicians from Regina, Saskatchewan